Nushan-e Olya (also Romanized as Nūshān-e ‘Olyā; also known as Nūshān) is a village in Dasht Rural District, Silvaneh District, Urmia County, West Azerbaijan Province, Iran. At the 2006 census, its population was 180, in 37 families.

References 

Populated places in Urmia County